Private Life is a 2018 American comedy-drama film written and directed by Tamara Jenkins and starring Paul Giamatti and Kathryn Hahn, with Kayli Carter, Molly Shannon, John Carroll Lynch, Desmin Borges, and Denis O'Hare in supporting roles. The film focuses on Richard and Rachel, a middle-aged married couple of New York City creatives, who are desperately trying to have a child by any means possible.

The film had its world premiere on January 18 at the Sundance Film Festival. It was released on October 5, 2018, by Netflix.

Plot
Richard and Rachel are a middle-aged couple desperately trying to have a child. After multiple failed attempts at artificial insemination, they attempt in vitro fertilisation. The couple learn that Richard has a blockage that is not letting him produce sperm, forcing him to undergo a surgery that puts him $10,000 in debt to his brother Charlie and his wife Cynthia. At the same time they are also attempting to adopt a child after connecting with a supposedly pregnant teenager from Arkansas who was looking to give up her child but then stopped contact.

After the IVF fails, their doctor floats the idea of using a donor egg to implant in Rachel, raising their chances of success from 4 to 65 percent. Rachel is initially against it, but slowly begins to consider it with Richard's encouragement.

Meanwhile, their 25-year-old niece, Sadie, decides to leave her college writing program to finish in absentia and go live in New York City with Richard and Rachel, with whom she is already very close. Rachel, who struggled with the idea of an unknown egg donor, decides to ask Sadie for her eggs. To their surprise, Sadie quickly agrees, both because she loves Richard and Rachel and because she thinks the egg donation will bring meaning to her life.

At Thanksgiving dinner, Sadie informs her family that she will be donating her egg to Richard and Rachel, much to her mother's chagrin. Despite the fact that Richard and Rachel tell Cynthia they will not go through with the donation without her consent, they decide to go through with pre-screening.

Richard, Rachel and Sadie happily go through the egg donor treatments together, but Sadie is told at an appointment that she is not developing eggs quickly enough. Determined not to let Richard and Rachel down, she increases her drug dosage on her own. The egg retrieval is a success, but Sadie becomes ill. Richard and Rachel take her to the hospital, where they learn of the increased dosage. Sadie moves out of their apartment.

Richard and Rachel go through with the implantation, but it is a failure. While Rachel is devastated, Richard admits to being relieved that they are finally done with trying as their marriage and intimacy have suffered.

Sometime later, they drop Sadie off at the Yaddo colony, where she will take up a residency as a writer. She thanks Rachel for her help getting in, but Rachel informs her she did nothing to aid her application and that Sadie did it all on her own.

Nine months later, Richard and Rachel receive a call from another woman looking at them as potential parents to adopt her child. They drive to a restaurant, where they wait to meet the woman. Richard moves from his usual opposite seat and sits next to Rachel to hold her hand.

Cast 
 Kathryn Hahn as Rachel Biegler
 Paul Giamatti as Richard Grimes
 Kayli Carter as Sadie Barrett
 Molly Shannon as Cynthia Grimes
 Denis O'Hare as Dr. Dordick
 Emily Robinson as Charlotte Grimes
 John Carroll Lynch as Charlie Grimes
 Desmin Borges as Sam
 Francesca Root-Dodson as Fiona
 Siobhan Fallon Hogan as Beth

Production 
On January 4, 2017, it was reported that Kathryn Hahn would star in the Netflix film Private Life, written and directed by Tamara Jenkins. On January 31, 2017, Paul Giamatti joined the cast. On March 16, 2017, it was reported that Molly Shannon, Emily Robinson, John Carroll Lynch, Kayli Carter, and Francesca Root-Dodson would also play roles in the film. As of March 17, 2017, principal photography had begun in White Plains, New York. Denis O'Hare and Desmin Borges subsequently joined the film as well.

Release
The film had its world premiere at the Sundance Film Festival on January 18. It also screened at the New York Film Festival on October 1, 2018. Netflix released Private Life on October 5, 2018, both in a limited theatrical bow and on its service.

Reception

Critical response
The site's critics consensus reads, "Private Life uses one couple's bumpy journey to take an affecting look at an easily identifiable – and too rarely dramatized – rite of adult passage." On Metacritic, the film holds a rating of 83 out of 100, based on 32 critics, indicating "universal acclaim."

Accolades

References

External links 
 
 

2018 films
2018 comedy-drama films
2018 independent films
American comedy-drama films
American independent films
American pregnancy films
English-language Netflix original films
Fertility medicine
Films about adoption
Films about writers
Films directed by Tamara Jenkins
Films set in Arkansas
Films set in New York City
Films shot in New York (state)
Films with screenplays by Tamara Jenkins
2010s English-language films
2010s American films